The 2009–10 A Group was the 86th season of the Bulgarian national top football division, and the 62nd of A Group as the top tier football league in the country. It began on 7 August 2009 with the game between Beroe and Lokomotiv Sofia. The last round took place on 16 May 2010. Levski Sofia were the defending champions, but they were unable to defend it and Litex Lovech won the title, which was their third overall.

Promotion and relegation from 2008–09
Belasitsa, Spartak Varna and Vihren were directly relegated for finishing in the bottom three places. Belasitsa ended a six-year stint in the Bulgarian top flight, while Spartak Varna were relegated for a record ninth time since the introduction of the A PFG, after three years. Vihren ended their four-year tenure in the A PFG, the club's first ever in the top division.

The relegated teams were replaced by Montana, champions of the West B PFG 2008-2009, and  Beroe, champions of the East B PFG 2008-2009. Montana returned to the A PFG after twelve years, while Beroe returned after a one-year absence. Beroe won promotion for the ninth time in its history, therefore equaling the record previously set by Minyor Pernik.

A further place in the league was decided through a one-legged play-off. Sportist Svoge as runner-up in West B PFG had to face Naftex Burgas, who came second in East B PFG. Sportist Svoge won the game 4–2 after a penalty shootout, following a regular time score of 2–2. This was Sportist's first participation in the Bulgarian top flight.

Team overview

League table

Results

Champions
Litex Lovech

Saidhodzha and Miranda left the club during a season.

Statistics

Top goalscorers
Source:Bulgarian PFL official site

Top assistants
Source:Sportal

Transfers
List of Bulgarian football transfers summer 2009
List of Bulgarian football transfers winter 2010

See also
 2009–10 B Group
 2009–10 Bulgarian Cup

References

External links
2009–10 Statistics of A Group at a-pfg.com

First Professional Football League (Bulgaria) seasons
1
Bul